The Widower is a British television drama originally broadcast in three one-hour instalments on ITV in 2014. The series portrays the life and crimes of convicted murderer Malcolm Webster. ITV described the show as: "The Widower tells how, over a 13-year period, a seemingly mild-mannered nurse, Malcolm Webster, set about poisoning and murdering his first wife, attempting to do the same to his second wife and moving on to a further scheme to deceive his third fiancée." The series was written by Jim Barton and Jeff Pope.

Production
In March 2014, ITV announced the broadcast of The Widower. Webster's estranged wife Felicity Drumm, his former partner Simone Banerjee and Detective Inspector Charlie Henry (who had led the investigation that led to Webster's arrest) all contributed to the production. It was shown in New Zealand on TV One in July 2014. Webster's first wedding was reconstructed, based on a VHS recording provided by his first wife's family.  Reece Shearsmith, who portrayed Webster, described him as a "horrible, petulant little boy ... who even now believes he has been wronged, his entire life has always been poor Malcolm, poor Malcolm, with no thought for the terrible crimes and the victims that he has left in his wake." Malcolm Webster was not approached (although his solicitor was informed that the film was being made). Banerjee complimented Shearsmith's performance and described the production as "99% accurate". Drumm initially declined to comment on the series.  She is said to have been reluctant to take part in the project, but felt obligated due to being financially destitute.  However she later discussed the series in an interview, in which she described the show as "strange to view" and criticised the show for not capturing Webster's personality which she described as "very extroverted, likable, funny, amusing person to be around, he was good company", whereas in the film he was portrayed as "not at all likable", which she felt marred the show's credibility. She stated also that he would adjust his personality to a particular woman. Claire Webster's brother Peter Morris was reported as being impressed by Smith's portrayal of his sister, stating: "Sheridan captured Claire completely. I miss that camaraderie of a sibling and I thank Sheridan for giving that back to me for a while."

Cast
 Reece Shearsmith as Malcolm Webster
 Sheridan Smith as Claire Webster 
 Fiona O'Carroll as Lucy
 Kate Fleetwood as Felicity Drumm 
 Archie Panjabi as Simone Banerjee
 John Hannah as DI Charlie Henry
 James Laurenson as Brian Drumm
 Juliet Alderice as Margaret Drumm
 Fereday Holmes as Jane Drumm
 Alex Ferns as DCI Neil Thompson
 Joanna Roth as Trisha Heron
 Paul Blair as DC Peter Jarvis

Episodes

References

External links
 

2014 British television series debuts
2014 British television series endings
2010s British crime drama television series
2010s British television miniseries
English-language television shows
ITV crime dramas
Murder in television
Television series about widowhood
Television series based on actual events
Television series by ITV Studios
Television shows set in the Republic of Ireland